Muhajir Camp is a neighbourhood in the Karachi West district of Karachi, Pakistan, that previously was a part of Baldia Town until 2011.

There are several ethnic groups in Muhajir Camp including Kathiawari, Muhajirs, Sindhis, Kashmiris, Seraikis, Pakhtuns, Balochis, Brahuis,
Memons, Bohras and Ismailis.

References

Neighbourhoods of Karachi
Baldia Town